Antônio Sérgio da Silva Arouca (20 August 1941 — 2 August 2003) was a Brazilian politician. He served as federal deputy for Rio de Janeiro from 1991 to 1999 by PCB and PPS.

In the 1989 presidential election, he ran for the Vice Presidency of Brazil on Roberto Freire's ticket by the Brazilian Communist Party (PCB), with no success.

Personal life 
He was born in Ribeirão Preto, São Paulo, on 20 August 1941. In 1966, he graduated in the Ribeirão Preto Medical School.

References 

People from Ribeirão Preto
1941 births
2003 deaths
Brazilian physicians
20th-century Brazilian physicians
Brazilian Communist Party politicians
Free Fatherland Party (Brazil) politicians
Members of the Chamber of Deputies (Brazil) from Rio de Janeiro (state)
Candidates for Vice President of Brazil
University of São Paulo alumni
20th-century Brazilian politicians